Kumbuyili is a community in Sagnarigu District in the Northern Region of Ghana. It is a dispersed settlement located along the Tamale-Kumbungu road having Gurugu, Malshagu and Zagyuri as its neighboring communities.

See also
Suburbs of Tamale (Ghana) metropolis

References 

Communities in Ghana
Suburbs of Tamale, Ghana